Goldthwaite is a surname. Notable people with the surname include:

Alfred Goldthwaite (1921–1997), American politician
Anne Goldthwaite (1869–1944), American painter
George Goldthwaite (1809–1879), American politician
Henry Goldthwaite (1802–1847), American jurist
Kevin Goldthwaite (born 1982), American soccer player
Richard A. Goldthwaite, a leading economic historian of the Italian Renaissance

See also
Goldthwait
Justice Goldthwaite (disambiguation)